Mobile marketing research is a method of data collection using functions of mobile phones, smart phones and PDAs. It utilizes strengths of mobile communication and applies them for research purposes.

Background

Due to the deep sociocultural changes towards digitization at the turn of the 21st century, it has become more and more difficult for the marketing research industry to address respondents that are both willing to participate in surveys and reachable via traditional media. Consumers were no longer clearly classified, which made it harder for marketing researchers to make obvious assumptions about their behavior. Researchers had to adopt their approaches to keep up with technology as well as coping with these changes in order to find out who customers are and what they want.

Definition and development
Mobile phones are practical, versatile and have already become an indispensable device for communication, being used day and night. Smartphones, in particular offer many different kinds of applications to fulfill further technical requirements. There are several mobile applications that provide mobile market research through smartphones. This is the basis to allow conducting empirical research studies. Besides the number of mobile phones, the number of smart phones and PDAs is still growing. In 2006, the number of worldwide mobile phone users exceeded the number of land line users. According to a study of PEW (Internet & American Life Projects) which examined more than 1000 internet leaders, analysts and executives, mobile devices will become the most often used instrument to connect to internet by the year 2020. According to Pew Research’s Internet & American Life study in January 2014, 58% of adults in the US had a smartphone, up from 56% in May 2013. In other parts of the world, like Central and Latin America, many people never had a PC, but they now have a smartphone. For instance, in Chile, more than 85% of the participants of an online panel had a smartphone in 2014, whereas only around 60% had a desktop. For many people the mobile phone is already a kind of "life-support tool”. Therefore, conducting surveys via mobile phones could possibly help to counteract against the generally declining motivation of respondents, as many potential participants enjoy using electronic devices. Particularly, it is difficult to reach the younger generation by traditional media, compared to more modern media such as cell phones. Therefore, this medium is very appropriate to address this target group. Even if some respondents declare that they still prefer to answer web surveys through PCs, the proportion which prefer to answer through smartphones is significant across many different countries.

Mobile survey methods

Methodology of data collection
According to Maxl, four different kinds of methods are distinguished which can be used as required. These are listed in the following figure.

Push studies without contexts (A) are conducted independently from time and location. This can be CATI- or CACI-studies as well as surveys by SMS or MMS. In cases of these research methods, the feedback impulse actively comes from the researcher.
With contextual push studies (B) the researcher prompts the respondent to give appropriate feedback once it is recognized that he/she is located in a particular environment or is in a certain situation.
Pull studies are characterized that participants call in the questionnaire themselves. In many cases short notes draw attention to a survey or an evaluation. Such communications may be placed in certain contexts (C) (e.g. on receipts, advertisements or product packaging) in order to encourage participation. Non-context-sensitive pull studies (D) are not relevant for marketing research since they provide only general feedback, which has no relation to a fixed object of research. Therefore, they are hardly controlled and evaluated.

Data collection on a technical view
On the technical level, three different possibilities of data collection are distinguished according to Pferdekämper/Batinic. The Short Message Service (SMS) outlines one possibility, which can be used as a basis to conduct interviews. This is very suitable for ad hoc surveys, if particular key questions have to be answered.
For Java applications, the participants receive a link to a WAP page where an application is to be downloaded. The survey software is immediately installed on the mobile phone and the survey can be filled out straight away.
Furthermore, surveys can be accessed via the mobile Internet. The webpage is also called in via WAP push. Questionnaires are created and designed in different formats. This allows disrupting to complete the questionnaire in order to further process on a different technical device with internet access.

Disadvantages and difficulties of mobile market research
Probably most important point to be discussed is the representativity of the sampling regarding the quality of data.
Based on the total population, those people who don’t own a mobile phone, cannot become part of the sampling. Mobile phone users have to be able to be reached as well as to be willing to take part in the survey. But it is by far not enough to just look at the users of mobile phones. Equally important is to also know the number of people who use the SMS service and how many of these people own a web-enabled phone. Only if all these aspects are being noticed, a final conclusion regarding the sampling can be drawn. For these reasons a mobile survey does not meet the standards of the statistical representativity.
As mentioned in the beginning, the restricted possibilities to access WAP-Surveys are another problem. The number of those who use the internet via their mobile phone is rather small: According to IFCom only 19% of all mobile phone users do so. But the data acquisition through mobile phones holds more difficulties. On one hand there are high costs for Incentives and an intensive recruitment by the institutes. On the other hand, the participants of the survey have to pay the costs for the internet usage via mobile phone. However, more and more respondents do not pay the internet access based on the time spent on Internet and more and more places proposes free Wi-Fi, making this issue less and less relevant for respondents. Additionally, there are also technical difficulties that may occur. The high number of different and not-compatible software or the low transmission rate of data are just a few to name. In order to improve the respondents' experience in answering the web surveys on mobile devices, optimizing the layout of the survey for smaller screen is crucial: non-optimized layouts lead to lower data quality.
Restrictions concerning the reveal and passing on of mobile phone numbers (because of data protection and the lack of Anonymity) are setting limits to the research in this field of study, too.

Advantages and possibilities of mobile market research
Statistical methods in the mobile market research profit from the fact that they do not depend on place or time. This means that surveys via mobile phone can be done anywhere and at any time and are therefore much more advantageous compared to surveys via land line phones. Considering that a high number of participants of the main target groups can not be reached at home at most hours of the day, the chance to get hold of them by mobile phone is much higher.
Especially with regard to people under the age of 25 as well as business people, who are often on the way and cannot get hold of easily, the chances of the mobile market research are promising. As most people always carry their mobile phone with them, an immediate transmission of personal impressions of current events, is possible at any time. Thus, the so-called ‘magic moment’ can be captured, which is often very helpful. Surveys concerning product placement and efficiency of sales promotion measures at the point of sale turned out to be perfectly realizable this way. Looking at the topic “Access possibilities to WAP-Surveys” by mobile phone, as well as at the topic “Getting hold of potential participants”, there are some developments that should be named. The trend towards the increasing distribution of web-enabled mobile phones, and the improved representativity that comes along with it, does still continue: from 2007 to 2008, Nielsen Mobile noticed an increase of the mobile internet usage.
With decreasing costs and an improving technology, a further upward tendency can be expected. In addition, the mobile internet usage increases with the rapidly developing distribution of smart phones. According to IM (Mediawork Initiative), already in 2013 more people will log in with their smart phone, than with a PC. Mobile statistics show a high and very fast response rate. As a result of the independency from time and place, answers can be submitted immediately. This also means that results can almost be transmitted in real time. A study from Globalpark shows that approximately 35% of the participants answered a mobile survey within 2 hours. Through the novelty of the form of survey and its playful design, mobile research has a motivating effect on the participants. This applies especially to young, technologically interested male persons. iPhone users are also considered to be very communicative. As the devices are easy to handle, the users are more likely and more motivated to take part in surveys. A study examining how to best reach mobile respondents published in the Journal Social Science Computer Review underlines the importance of social factors. Especially their subjective belief of how they are seen by significant others, or their intention of how they would like to be seen by significant others seem to play a major role in their mobile phone behavior.

References

Market research
Mobile technology